Give a Pet a Home is a factual British television show that was presented by Amanda Holden. The series aired for six episodes from 15 April until 20 May 2015.

Format
The six-part series was filmed at an RSPCA animal centre in Birmingham. The show featured celebrities who, each week aimed to find a pet a new home.

The series was fronted by Amanda Holden. She said: "I'm so delighted to be hosting this new series that will look into the amazing work the RSPCA do and hopefully we'll be able to find some much needed new homes for the pets featured on the show. I am just going to have to stop myself from taking them all home with me!"

Celebrities
On 20 March 2015, the full celebrity line-up for Give a Pet a Home was revealed as:

Chris Kamara
Coleen Nolan
Denise Lewis
Julian Clary
Kimberly Wyatt
Peter Andre

Ratings
Official viewing figures are from BARB.

References

External links

Official broadcaster website
Official Twitter
Production website
RSPCA website

2015 British television series debuts
2015 British television series endings
ITV (TV network) original programming
English-language television shows
Television series by Endemol